Iraqi clubs in the AFC Club Competitions. From its introduction in 2002 until the forming of the AFC Professional League in 2009, Iraqi clubs were allowed to enter the AFC Champions League (ACL). Despite reaching respectable results, none of the Iraqi teams managed to get further than the group stage.

Since Iraq did not meet the new AFC standards for the ACL, its clubs participated in the AFC Cup from 2009 until 2018 (however, the AFC gave Iraq one qualifying spot for the ACL for the 2014 edition only). Al-Quwa Al-Jawiya won the AFC Cup three times, in 2016, 2017 and 2018. Iraqi clubs returned to the ACL group stage in 2019.

Participations

1971–2002

2002–present

Iraqi clubs statistics

2002–present

Al-Minaa

Al-Najaf

Al-Quwa Al-Jawiya

Al-Shorta

Al-Talaba

Al-Zawraa

Duhok

Erbil

Naft Al-Wasat

Notes

See also
 Iraqi Premier League
 Iraq FA Cup
 Australian clubs in the AFC Champions League
 Chinese clubs in the AFC Champions League
 Indian football clubs in Asian competitions
 Indonesian football clubs in Asian competitions
 Iranian clubs in the AFC Champions League
 Japanese clubs in the AFC Champions League
 Myanmar clubs in the AFC Champions League
 Qatari clubs in the AFC Champions League
 Saudi Arabian clubs in the AFC Champions League
 South Korean clubs in the AFC Champions League
 Thai clubs in the AFC Champions League
 Vietnamese clubs in the AFC Champions League

References

External links
 Iraq Football Association
 

 
Asian football clubs in international competitions
Football clubs in the AFC Champions League
Football clubs in the AFC Cup